KPRA may refer to:

 Kingpin to rear axle, a measurement of the length of a semi-tractor trailer
 KPRA (FM) (89.5 FM), a radio station in Ukiah, California